Stress management is a wide spectrum of techniques and psychotherapies aimed at controlling a person's level of stress, especially chronic stress, usually for the purpose of improving everyday functioning. Stress produces numerous physical and mental symptoms which vary according to each individual's situational factors. These can include a decline in physical health, such as headaches,  chest pain, fatigue, and sleep problems, as well as depression. The process of stress management is named as one of the keys to a happy and successful life in modern society. Life often delivers numerous demands that can be difficult to handle, but stress management provides a number of ways to manage anxiety and maintain overall well-being.

Despite stress often being thought of as a subjective experience, levels of stress are readily measurable; using various physiological tests, similar to those used in polygraphs.

There are several models of stress management, each with distinctive explanations of mechanisms for controlling stress.  Much more research is necessary to provide a better understanding of which mechanisms actually operate and are effective in practice.

Historical foundations
Walter Cannon and Hans Selye used animal studies to establish the earliest scientific basis for the study of stress. They measured the physiological responses of animals to external pressures, such as heat and cold, prolonged restraint, and surgical procedures then extrapolated from these studies to human beings.

Subsequent studies of stress in humans by Richard Rahe and others established the view that stress is caused by distinct, measurable life stressors, and further, that these life stressors can be ranked by the median degree of stress they produce (leading to the Holmes and Rahe stress scale). Thus, stress was traditionally conceptualized to be a result of external insults beyond the control of those experiencing the stress. More recently, however, it has been argued that external circumstances do not have any intrinsic capacity to produce stress, but instead, their effect is mediated by the individual's perceptions, capacities, and understanding.

Models

The generalized models are:
 The emergency response/fight-or-flight response by Walter Cannon (1914, 1932)
 General Adaptation Syndrome by Hans Selye (1936)
 Stress Model of Henry and Stephens (1977)
 Transactional (or cognitive) Stress Model / stress model of Lazarus after Lazarus (1974)
 Theory of resource conservation by Stevan Hobfoll (1988, 1998; Hobfoll & Buchwald, 2004)

Transactional model

In 1981, Richard Lazarus and Susan Folkman suggested that stress can be thought of as resulting from an "imbalance between demands and resources" or as occurring when "pressure exceeds one's perceived ability to cope". Stress management was developed and premised on the idea that stress is not a direct response to a stressor but rather one's resources and ability to cope mediate the stress response and are amenable to change, thus allowing stress to be controllable.

Among the many stressors mentioned by employees, these are the most common:
 Conflicts in company
 The way employees are treated by their bosses/supervisors or company
 Lack of job security
 Company policies
 Co-workers who do not do their fair share
 Unclear expectations
 Poor communication
 Not enough control over assignments
 Inadequate pay or benefits
 Urgent deadlines
 Too much work
 Long hours
 Time consumption
 Uncomfortable physical conditions
 Relationship conflicts
 Co-workers making careless mistakes
 Dealing with rude customers
 Lack of co-operation
 How the company treats co-workers

In order to develop an effective stress management program, it is first necessary to identify the factors that are central to a person controlling his/her stress and to identify the intervention methods which effectively target these factors. Lazarus and Folkman's interpretation of stress focuses on the transaction between people and their external environment (known as the Transactional Model). The model contends that stress may not be a stressors if the person does not perceive the stressors as a threat but rather as positive or even challenging. Also, if the person possesses or can use adequate coping skills, then stress may not actually be a result or develop because of the stressors. The model proposes that people can be taught to manage their stress and cope with their stressors. They may learn to change their perspective of the stressors and provide them with the ability and confidence to improve their lives and handle all of the types of stressors.

Health realization/innate health model
The health realization/innate health model of stress is also founded on the idea that stress does not necessarily follow the presence of a potential stressor. Instead of focusing on the individual's appraisal of so-called stressors in relation to his or her own coping skills (as the transactional model does), the health realization model focuses on the nature of thought, stating that it is ultimately a person's thought processes that determine the response to potentially stressful external circumstances. In this model, stress results from appraising oneself and one's circumstances through a mental filter of insecurity and negativity, whereas a feeling of well-being results from approaching the world with a "quiet mind". This theory deposits that moods fluctuate and cannot be changed by a specific pattern of thinking.  Mental discomfort is only deepened by focus on how to change one's mood, so moods should be "waited out" and dwelling avoided based on this framework. This model proposes that helping stressed individuals understand the nature of thought—especially providing them with the ability to recognize when they are in the grip of insecure thinking, disengage from it, and access natural positive feelings—will reduce their stress.

Techniques

Many stress management techniques cope with stresses one may find themselves withholding. Some of the following ways reduce a lower than usual stress level temporarily, to compensate the biological issues involved; others face the stressors at a higher level of abstraction:

Some stresses are caused by high demand levels that load the person with extra effort and work. in this case, a new time schedule can be worked up, limiting the normal frequency and duration of former schedules until the period of abnormally high personal demand has passed.

Techniques of stress management will vary according to the philosophical paradigm.

Stress prevention and resilience
Although many techniques have traditionally been developed to deal with the consequences of stress, considerable research has also been conducted on the prevention of stress, a subject closely related to psychological resilience-building.  A number of self-help approaches to stress-prevention and resilience-building have been developed, drawing mainly on the theory and practice of cognitive-behavioral therapy.

Measuring stress
Several techniques exist for measuring stress levels. One way is through the use of psychological testing: The Holmes and Rahe Stress Scale [two scales of measuring stress] is used to rate stressful life events, while the DASS [Depression Anxiety Stress Scales] contains a scale for stress based on self-report items. Changes in blood pressure and galvanic skin response can also be measured to test stress levels, and changes in stress levels. A digital thermometer can be used to evaluate changes in skin temperature, which can indicate activation of the fight-or-flight response drawing blood away from the extremities. Deep neural network models using photoplethysmography imaging (PPGI) data from mobile cameras can accurately measure stress levels. Cortisol is the main hormone released during a stress response and measuring cortisol from hair will give a 60- to 90-day baseline stress level of an individual.  This method of measuring stress is currently the most popular method in the clinic.

Effectiveness
Stress management has physiological and immune benefits.

Positive outcomes are observed using a combination of non-drug interventions:
 treatment of anger or hostility,
 autogenic training
 talking therapy (around relationship or existential issues)
 biofeedback
 cognitive therapy for anxiety or clinical depression

Types of stress

Acute stress
Acute stress is the most common form of stress among humans worldwide. It deals with the pressures of the near future or the very recent past. While acute stress is often interpreted as being a negative experience, it can actually be beneficial and even necessary for one’s wellbeing because of its protective effects against potentially dangerous threats. Slamming on the brakes while driving in order to avoid a car accident could be considered a moment of beneficial acute stress. Running or any other form of exercise would also be considered an acute stressor. Some exciting or exhilarating experiences such as riding a roller coaster is an acute stress but is usually very enjoyable. Acute stress is a short term stress and as a result, does not have enough time to do the damage that long term stress causes.

Chronic stress
Unlike acute stress, which only lasts for a moment, chronic stress lasts for longer time spans. It has a wearing effect on people that can become a very serious health risk if it continues over a long period of time.

Chronic stress can lead to memory loss, damage spatial recognition and produce a decreased drive of eating. Additional symptoms of chronic stress include aches and pains, insomnia or other sleep disturbances, changes in social behaviors, low energy, emotional withdrawal or other changes in emotional responses, and unfocused thinking. Chronic stress has also been associated with other medical conditions such as hypertension, heart disease, diabetes, obesity, and arthritis.

The severity varies from person to person. Gender difference can also be an underlying factor. Women are able to take longer durations of stress than men without showing the same maladaptive changes. Men can deal with shorter stress duration better than women can but once males hit a certain threshold, the chances of them developing mental issues increase drastically.

Workplace
All of us have some position in society, in the workplace, within the family, economic status and so on. Unfortunately, most of us are unwilling to accept where we are. Instead, we wish we were somewhere else, usually at a higher position. Managing that stress becomes vital in order to keep up job performance as well as relationship with co-workers and employers. For some workers, changing the work environment relieves work stress. Making the environment less competitive between employees decreases some amounts of stress.

That said, stress in the workplace does not always have to be negatively viewed. When managed well, stress can increase employees' focus and productivity.

According to the Yerkes–Dodson law, stress is beneficial to human functioning, but only up to a point. People who experience too low levels of stress might feel understimulated and passive; people experiencing stress that are at excessively high levels would feel overwhelmed, anxious, and irritable. Thus, establishing an optimum level of stress is key.

Organizational stress levels that an individual faces is dependent not just on external factors such as job characteristics or environment, but also on intrapersonal factors such as personality, temperament, and individual coping and thinking styles. Both aspects need to be managed well.

Also, stress at workplace is not  limited to employees. Entrepreneurs also undergo stress This stress can vary from team management, business management or unfavorable policy from the government.

Some examples of stressors in the workplace can be their perception of Organization Commitment, which is the way an employee conceptualizes his/her reasons for staying in the organizations for either Affective, Continuance, or Normative reasons.

Affective commitment to the organization is ideal, as it is the situation where an employee strongly identifies with the values and culture of the organization. While this is not directly telling of an employee's stress levels, genuine interest and enjoyment in the employee's work and work relations places the employee in a good position to manage stress well.

Employees who stay in an organization for continuance reasons stay as a result of weighing the pros and cons, and then decides that the opportunity cost of leaving the organization is too high.

Employees under this category might experience moderate levels of stress, as their reasons for staying is driven more by external rather than internal motivation.

Employees who stay for normative reasons, however, are most likely to experience the highest levels of stress, as these are the employees who stay out of obligation and duty.

Salary can also be an important concern of employees. Salary can affect the way people work because they can aim for promotion and in result, a higher salary. This can lead to chronic stress.

Cultural differences have also shown to have some major effects on stress coping problems. Eastern Asian employees may deal with certain work situations differently from how a Western North American employee would. In a study conducted in Malaysia, it was found that while the classification of workplace stress is similar between Malaysians and Western employees, the perception of workplace stress as well as the approaches to coping with stress were different.

In order to manage stress in the workplace, employers can provide stress managing programs such as therapy, communication programs, and a more flexible work schedule. There have been many studies conducted demonstrating the benefits of mindfulness practices on subjective well-being and work outcomes. Productivity, organization, and performance increase, while burnout rates decrease.

Medical environment

A study was done on the stress levels in general practitioners and hospital consultants in 1999. Over 500 medical employees participated in this study done by R.P Caplan. These results showed that 47% of the workers scored high on their questionnaire for high levels of stress. 27% of the general practitioners even scored to be very depressed. These numbers came to a surprise to Dr. Caplan and it showed how alarming the large number of medical workers become stressed out because of their jobs. Managers stress levels were not as high as the actual practitioners themselves. An eye opening statistic showed that nearly 54% of workers suffered from anxiety while being in the hospital. Although this was a small sample size for hospitals around the world, Caplan feels this trend is probably fairly accurate across the majority of hospitals.

Stress management programs
Many businesses today have begun to use stress management programs for employees who are having trouble adapting to stress at the workplace or at home. Some companies provide special equipments adapting to stress at the workplace to their employees, like coloring diaries and stress relieving gadgets. Many people have spill over stress from home into their working environment. There are a couple of ways businesses today try to reduce the stress levels of their employees. One way is through individual intervention. This starts off by monitoring the stressors in the individual. After monitoring what causes the stress, next is attacking that stressor and trying to figure out ways to alleviate them in any way. Developing social support is vital in individual intervention, being with others to help you cope has proven to be a very effective way to avoid stress. Avoiding the stressors altogether is the best possible way to get rid of stress but that is very difficult to do in the workplace. Changing behavioral patterns, may in turn, help reduce some of the stress that is put on at work as well.

Employee assistance programs can include in-house counseling programs on managing stress. Evaluative research has been conducted on EAPs that teach individuals stress control and inoculation techniques such as relaxation, biofeedback, and cognitive restructuring. Studies show that these programs can reduce the level of physiological arousal associated with high stress. Participants who master behavioral and cognitive stress-relief techniques report less tension, fewer sleep disturbances, and an improved ability to cope with workplace stressors.

Another way of reducing stress at work is by simply changing the workload for an employee, or even giving them more control as to when or where they work. Some may be too overwhelmed that they have so much work to get done, or some also may have such little work that they are not sure what to do with themselves at work.

Improving communications between employees also sounds like a simple approach, but it is very effective for helping reduce stress. Sometimes making the employee feel like they are a bigger part of the company, such as giving them a voice in bigger situations shows that you trust them and value their opinion. Having all the employees mesh well together is a very underlying factor which can take away much of workplace stress. If employees fit well together and feed off of each other, the chances of much stress are minimal. Lastly, changing the physical qualities of the workplace may reduce stress. Changing things such as the lighting, air temperature, odor, and up to date technology.

Intervention is broken down into three steps: primary, secondary, tertiary. Primary deals with eliminating the stressors altogether. Secondary deals with detecting stress and figuring out ways to cope with it and improving stress management skills. Finally, tertiary deals with recovery and rehabbing the stress altogether. These three steps are usually the most effective way to deal with stress not just in the workplace, but overall.

Aviation industry
Aviation is a high-stress industry, given that it requires a high level of precision at all times. Chronically high stress levels can ultimately decrease the performance and compromise safety.  To be effective, stress measurement tools must be specific to the aviation industry, given its unique working environment and other stressors. Stress measurement in aviation seeks to quantify the psychological stress experienced by aviators, with the goal of making needed improvements to aviators' coping and stress management skills.

To more precisely measure stress, aviators' many responsibilities are broken down into "workloads."  This helps to categorise the broad concept of "stress" by specific stressors.  Additionally, since different workloads may pose unique stressors, this method may be more effective than measuring stress levels as a whole.  Stress measurement tools can then help aviators identify which stressors are most problematic for them, and help them improve on managing workloads, planning tasks, and coping with stress more effectively.

To evaluate workload, a number of tools can be used.  The major types of measurement tools are:
 Performance-based measures;
 Subjective measures, like questionnaires which aviators answer themselves; and
 Physiological measures, like measurement of heart rate.

Implementation of evaluation tools requires time, instruments for measurement, and software for collecting data.

Measurement systems
The most commonly used stress measurement systems are primarily rating scale-based.  These systems tend to be complex, containing multiple levels with a variety of sections, to attempt to capture the many stressors present in the aviation industry.  Different systems may be utilised in different operational specialties.

 The Perceived Stress Scale (PSS) – The PSS is a widely used subjective tool for measuring stress levels.  It consists of 10 questions, and asks participants to rate, on a five-point scale, how stressed they felt after a certain event.  All 10 questions are summed to obtain a total score from 0 to 40.  In the aviation industry, for example, it has been used with flight training students to measure how stressed they felt after flight training exercises.
 The Coping Skills Inventory – This inventory measures aviators' skills for coping with stress.  This is another subjective measure, asking participants to rate, on a five-point scale, the extent to which they use eight common coping skills: Substance abuse, Emotional support, Instrumental support (help with tangible things, like child care, finances, or task sharing), Positive reframing (changing one's thinking about a negative event, and thinking of it as a positive instead), Self-blame, Planning, Humour and Religion. An individual's total score indicates the extent to which he or she is using effective, positive coping skills (like humor and emotional support); ineffective, negative coping skills (like substance abuse and self-blame); and where the individual could improve.
 The Subjective Workload Assessment Technique (SWAT) – SWAT is a rating system used to measure individuals' perceived mental workload while performing a task, like developing instruments in a lab, multitasking aircraft duties, or conducting air defense.  SWAT combines measurements and scaling techniques to develop a global rating scale.

Pilot stress report systems
Early pilot stress report systems were adapted and modified from existing psychological questionnaires and surveys.  The data from these pilot-specific surveys is then processed and analyzed through an aviation-focused system or scale.  Pilot-oriented questionnaires are generally designed to study work stress or home stress. Self-report can also be used to measure a combination of home stress, work stress, and perceived performance. A study conducted by Fiedler, Della Rocco, Schroeder and Nguyen (2000) used Sloan and Cooper's modification of the Alkov questionnaire to explore aviators' perceptions of the relationship between different types of stress.  The results indicated that pilots believed performance was impaired when home stress carried over to the work environment. The degree of home stress that carried over to work environment was significantly and negatively related to flying performance items, such as planning, control, and accuracy of landings. The questionnaire was able to reflect pilots' retroactive perceptions and the accuracy of these perceptions.

Alkov, Borowsky, and Gaynor started a 22-item questionnaire for U.S. Naval aviators in 1982 to test the hypothesis that inadequate stress coping strategies contributed to flight mishaps. The questionnaire consists of items related to lifestyle changes and personality characteristics. After completing the questionnaire, the test group is divided into two groups: "at-fault" with mishap, and "not-at-fault" in a mishap. Then, questionnaires from these two groups were analyzed to examine differences. A study of British commercial airline pilots, conducted by Sloan and Cooper (1986), surveyed 1,000 pilot members from the British Airline Pilots' Association (BALPA).  They used a modified version of Alkov, Borowsky, and Gaynor's questionnaire to collect data on pilots'  perceptions of the relationship between stress and performance.  Being a subjective measure, this study's data was based on pilots' perceptions, and thus rely on how accurately they recall past experiences their relationships to stress.  Despite relying on subjective perceptions and memories, the study showed that pilot reports are noteworthy.

Beck Depression Inventory (BDI) is another scale used in many industries, including the mental health professions, to screen for depressive symptoms.
 
Parsa and Kapadia (1997) used the BDI to survey a group of 57 U.S. Air Force fighter pilots who had flown combat operations.  The adaptation of the BDI to the aviation field was problematic.  However, the study revealed some unexpected findings.  The results indicated that 89% of the pilots reported insomnia; 86% reported irritability; 63%, dissatisfaction; 38%, guilt; and 35%, loss of libido.  50% of two squadrons and 33% of another squadron scored above 9 on the BDI, suggesting at least low levels of depression.  Such measurement may be difficult to interpret accurately.

College
College can be a stressful time for many students, as they adjust to a new and unfamiliar environment while transitioning from adolescence to adulthood. Nearly 80% of college students report frequently dealing with daily stress. Sources of stress that influence college students’ stress levels include family and friends who are often physically further away, as well as changes in communication patterns with these individuals. Long-held beliefs (i.e. religious beliefs) as well as new opportunities for various behavior (i.e. alcohol and drug use) are also significant influential factors. In addition to these potential sources of stress, college students are also faced with often rigorous academic demands. In order to manage this stress, students rely on many strategies including problem-focused and emotion-focused coping.

Problem-focused strategies employ action-oriented behavioral activities like planning, for example. Emotion-focused strategies involve the expression of emotion and often include the altering of expectations. Although problem-focused strategies have often been found to be more effective than emotion-focused strategies, both categories include coping mechanisms that effectively reduce the negative impacts of stress.

There are several practical examples of problem-focused or approach-based coping strategies. Notably, developing time management skills, avoiding procrastination, and goal-setting are associated with stress reduction. These skills allow students to better prioritize new responsibilities, leaving them more time for sleep and leisure activities, which have been shown to reduce stress. Additionally, working towards or maintaining healthy sleep habits helps individuals better cope with high levels of stress.

Several emotion-focused strategies have also been found to be effective in combating stress. Accommodation strategies that do not directly change the stressor, but rather change one's emotions surrounding the stressors, such as positive re framing, are widely associated with stress reduction. Strategies like finding humor and journaling—especially gratitude journaling—are also effective.

Without effective coping skills, students tend to engage in unsafe behaviors as a means of trying to reduce the stress they feel. 
Ineffective coping strategies popular among college students include drinking excessively, drug use, excessive caffeine consumption, withdrawal from social activities, self-harm, and eating disorders. These ineffective strategies can be dangerous because they often become habitual, addictive, and sometimes fatal. For example, when college students turn to drinking as a way of coping with stress, they begin to drink larger quantities and more frequently, instead of just occasionally with friends.  This can lead to alcohol poisoning, addiction, and other dangerous behaviors. The problems these coping methods create can cause more harm than good and often lead to more stress for the student.

Researchers have not found significant gender differences in regard to how men and women use problem-focused coping strategies. However, there is gender variation in regard to emotion-focused coping. Women tend to use emotion-focused coping strategies more often than men on average. However, men do report using one emotion-focused coping strategy more often than women—mental disengagement in the form of alcohol use. Mental disengagement refers to when individuals refocus their negative emotions to an alternative resource, such as alcohol, instead of addressing the original stressor.  Overall, women report higher stress levels than men, specifically for social relationships, daily hassles, finances, self-imposed stress, frustration, and academics. This could be because women are often more in-tune to their emotions and are more comfortable expressing their feelings.

While stress for college students is part of the transitional experience, there are many strategies that students can use to reduce stress in their lives and manage the impacts of stress. Time management skills which encompass goal setting, scheduling, and pacing are effective approaches to reducing stress. Additionally, students should keep up their physical and mental health with regular exercise, healthy eating, good sleep habits, and mindfulness practices. There are several services, such as counseling and therapy, available to students that can be accessed both on and off campus to support stress management and overall student wellbeing.

See also

 Abusive power and control
 Occupational health psychology
 Occupational Health Science

References

Stress (biological and psychological)
Management by type
Treatment of mental disorders
Occupational health psychology